Galluccio is an Italian surname. Notable people with the surname include:

 Anthony D. Galluccio (born 1967), politician in Massachusetts 
 Miguel Galluccio (born 1968), Argentine petroleum engineer and director of YPF
 Steve Galluccio, Canadian screenwriter

Italian-language surnames